Love and a Savage is a 1915 silent film comedy written and directed by Al Christie and starring Betty Compson. It was produced by the Nestor Film Company and released through Universal Film Manufacturing Company.

Cast
Betty Compson - Betty
Stella Adams - Betty's Mother
Harry Rattenberry - Betty's Father 
Eddie Lyons - Eddie
Lee Moran - Lee
Gus Alexander - The Chef
Jane Waller - The Maid
Ethel Lynne - The Other Girl
Harry Lyons

See also
Betty Compson filmography

References

External links
Love is a Savage at IMDb.com

1915 films
American black-and-white films
American silent short films
Films directed by Al Christie
Universal Pictures short films
Silent American comedy films
1915 comedy films
1910s American films